Drees is a surname. Notable people with the surname include:

Jack Drees (1917–1988), American sportscaster
James Drees (1930–2022), American politician
Jochen Drees (born 1970), German football referee
Tom Drees (born 1963), American baseball player
Willem B. Drees (born 1954), Dutch philosopher
Willem Drees (1886–1988), Dutch politician and prime minister
Willem Drees Jr. (1922–1998), Dutch politician